Torquaratoridae (Latin for "neck plow") is a family of acorn worms (Hemichordata) that lives in deep waters between 350 to 4000 meters (the species Tergivelum baldwinae has been found 4100 meters below the surface). They can grow up to three feet in length and have semitransparent gelatinous bodies, often brightly colored.

Cilia on their underside are used to glide over the ocean floor at about three inches per hour, while detritus is sucked into their gut, leaving behind a constant trail of feces. When deciding to move to new feeding locations, they empty their gut and drift over the bottom, aided by an excreted balloon of mucus, before they let themselves down somewhere else.

One species (Coleodesmium karaensis) has been shown to care for the offspring by bearing about a dozen embryos surrounded by a thin membrane in shallow depressions on the surface of the mother's pharyngeal region.

The proboscis skeleton is reduced to a small medial plate in one genus, while it is absent in the remaining species, and the stomochord reduced in adults. Terminstomo arcticus have lost the heart, blood sinus and proboscis skeleton, and has a stomochord that extends from the posterior end of the proboscis through the entire length of the collar. Their large eggs, which measure almost 2 millimetres across, suggest that there is direct development without larvae.

Their genitals are unusual by being located outside the body. On each side of the worm, a flap of the skin runs the entire length of the trunk. Located on the inner surfaces of these flaps, the numerous ovaries and testicles bulge outwards in an epidermal pouch attached to the rest of the body by a slender stalk. The ovaries' eggs are protected by just a single layer of cells. One species, Yoda purpurata, is also the first known hermaphroditic hemichordate. It is assumed that these modifications are an adaptation to life in their deep sea habitats.

Only one known species (Allapasus aurantiacus) is muscular and robust enough to burrow into substrates. The other species have a very reduced body musculature and are too gelatinous and fragile to do so. Instead they live directly on the seafloor. The extra-wide-lipped species shows the most obvious adaptations to the free living lifestyle, and they are found almost exclusively on rocks of deep-sea lava formations.

At depths between 1500 and 3700m, these animals are often the most numerous, along with echinoderms, molluscs, crustaceans and fish.

Genera 

 Allapasus Holland, Kuhnz & Osborn, 2012
 Coleodesmium Osborn, Gebruk, Rogacheva & Holland, 2013
 Tergivelum Holland, Jones, Ellena, Ruhl & Smith, 2009
 Torquarator Holland, Clague, Gordon, Gebruk, Pawson & Vecchione, 2005
 Yoda Priede, Osborn, Gebruk, Jones, Shale, Rogacheva & Holland, 2012

References

Enteropneusta